Sceloporus cozumelae, the Cozumel spiny lizard, is a species of lizard in the family Phrynosomatidae. It is endemic to Mexico.

The species is native to coastal areas of the Yucatán Peninsula, where it has been found in Yucatán, Quintana Roo, and northernmost Campeche, and on the islands of Cozumel, Isla Contoy, and Isla Mujeres, from sea level up to 50 meters elevation.

References

Sceloporus
Endemic reptiles of Mexico
Fauna of the Yucatán Peninsula
Reptiles described in 1927